The order Falconiformes is represented by the extant family Falconidae (falcons and caracaras) and a handful of enigmatic Paleogene species. Traditionally, the other bird of prey families Cathartidae (New World vultures and condors), Sagittariidae (secretarybird), Pandionidae (ospreys), Accipitridae (hawks) were classified in Falconiformes. A variety of comparative genome analysis published since 2008, however, found that falcons are part of a clade of birds called Australaves, which also includes seriemas, parrots and passerines. Within Australaves falcons are more closely related to the parrot-passerine clade (Psittacopasserae), which together they form the clade Eufalconimorphae. The hawks and vultures occupy a basal branch in the clade Afroaves in their own clade Accipitrimorphae, closer to owls and woodpeckers.

See below cladogram of Telluraves relationships based on Braun & Kimball (2021):

The fossil record of Falconiformes sensu stricto is poorly documented. The only stem-falcon that has mostly complete remains is Masillaraptor parvunguis, while the other taxa Stintonornis mitchelli and Parvulivenator watteli are known from fragmentary remains. Mayr (2009) noted the similarity of Masillaraptor to the seriemas. One study from Wang et al. (2012) using 30 nuclear loci from 28 taxa found Falconidae and Cariamidae being sister taxa to each other. This is, however, not been supported by the latest major neoavian phylogenetic studies. A 2022 study recovers massilaraptorids as true falcons.

References

Bird orders
Eocene taxonomic orders
Oligocene taxonomic orders
Miocene taxonomic orders
Pliocene taxonomic orders
Pleistocene taxonomic orders
Holocene taxonomic orders